Massimo Bonini (born 13 October 1959) is a Sammarinese former professional football player and coach, who played as a midfielder for Italian sides Bellaria Igea, Forlì, Cesena, Juventus and Bologna.

His greatest achievements in club football were at Juventus, where his work-rate enabled him to form a notable midfield partnership with French playmaker Michel Platini and mezzala Marco Tardelli, having won 3 Serie A titles, 1 Italian Cup, 1 European Cup, 1 Cup Winners' Cup, 1 European Super Cup and 1 Intercontinental Cup and becoming the first and only Sanmarinese footballer to win a UEFA club competition.

At the international level, he gained 19 caps for the San Marino national football team.

One of only two Sanmarinese sportsmen to have won a world title alongside motorcyclist Manuel Poggiali, he is regarded the most iconic athlete born in the country. For its 50th anniversary in 2004, UEFA asked each of its then 52 member associations to nominate one player as the single most outstanding player of the period 1954–2003, and Bonini was chosen as the Golden Player of San Marino by the San Marino Football Federation in November 2003.

Club career
Bonini began his career at Juvenes Dogana in 1973 but failed to make a league appearance during his 4 years at the club. After leaving Juvenes Dogana in 1977, he moved on to join Bellaria, going on to make 33 appearances scoring 1 goal. After leaving Bellaria in 1978, he moved on to join Forli, going on to make 23 appearances, scoring 1 goal. After leaving Forli in 1979, he moved to Cesena, appearing 60 times and scoring 5 goals.

After leaving Cesena in 1981, Bonini played for Juventus between 1981 and 1988, in which he played 296 matches and scored 6 goals. He won 3 Scudetti, 1 Italian Cup, 1 European Cup, 1 Cup Winners' Cup, 1 European Super Cup and 1 Intercontinental Cup. He is the only Sammarinese footballer to have won an official international title. For his performances, he was awarded the Bravo Award in 1983, as the best under-23 player in European Competitions.

After leaving Juventus in 1988, he moved to Bologna going on to make 112 appearances and scoring 5 goals. Bonini retired in 1993.

One of the solely two Sanmarinese sportsmen to have won a world title alongside motorcyclist Manuel Poggiali, he is regarded the most iconic athlete born in the country.

International career
Since the San Marino Football Federation was not officially recognised by the Union of European Football Associations (UEFA) until 1990, players from San Marino were assimilated to Italian players. For this reason, Bonini was entitled to play for the Italian Football Federation and actually played for the Italian Under-21 football team. Since he always refused to give up the citizenship of San Marino, he had to wait until 1990 in order to play for San Marino's first team, winning 19 full caps since then. He played his first match for San Marino against Switzerland on 14 November 1990.

Managerial career
After his retirement, Bonini also briefly served as the head coach of the San Marino national football team, from 2 June 1996 to 10 September 1997.

Style of play
Bonini was a hardworking, energetic and versatile box-to-box midfielder, who was frequently deployed as a central midfielder or as a defensive midfielder during his time at Juventus. Although this position did not provide him with the freedom to contribute offensively or creatively that he had possessed in his early career, he excelled in his new role as a ball winner, and at breaking down opposition plays, due to his tactical intelligence, work-rate and positional sense, supporting his more creative teammates defensively, such as Michel Platini, alongside Marco Tardelli. He was known in particular for his pace and stamina, which earned him the nickname "Platini's lungs", due to his successful partnership in midfield with the Frenchman.

Honours
Juventus
Serie A: 1981–82, 1983–84, 1985–86
Coppa Italia: 1982–83
European Cup: 1984–85
European Cup Winners' Cup: 1983–84
European Super Cup: 1984
Intercontinental Cup: 1985

Individual
Bravo Award: 1983
UEFA Jubilee Awards - Golden Player of San Marino: 2004
Medaglia d'oro al valore atletico CONS: 1989
FIFA Centennial Golden Medal: 2005

References

External links
UEFA.com's article on San Marino's Golden Player

UEFA Golden Players
1959 births
Living people
Sammarinese footballers
San Marino international footballers
Italian footballers
Italy under-21 international footballers
Italian people of Sammarinese descent
Forlì F.C. players
A.C. Cesena players
Juventus F.C. players
Bologna F.C. 1909 players
A.C. Bellaria Igea Marina players
Serie A players
Serie B players
Sammarinese expatriate footballers
San Marino national football team managers
Association football midfielders
Italian football managers
Sammarinese expatriate sportspeople in Italy